Aleksandr Yevgenyevich Filtsov (born 2 January 1990) is a Russian former professional football goalkeeper.

Club career
He made his debut in the Russian Premier League on 18 June 2011 for FC Lokomotiv Moscow in a game against FC Spartak Moscow when Lokomotiv's first-choice goalkeeper Guilherme was sent off.

FC Krasnodar bought out his contract from FC Lokomotiv Moscow after he played 8 games for Krasnodar on loan.

On 20 June 2014, Filtsov joined Rubin Kazan.

On 31 August 2019, he signed with Belarusian club Shakhtyor Soligorsk.

Career statistics

References

External links
 
 

1990 births
Living people
People from Amur Oblast
Russian footballers
Association football goalkeepers
Russia youth international footballers
Russia under-21 international footballers
Russian Premier League players
Russian expatriate footballers
Expatriate footballers in Belarus
FC Lokomotiv Moscow players
FC Krasnodar players
FC Rubin Kazan players
FC Arsenal Tula players
FC Anzhi Makhachkala players
FC Rotor Volgograd players
FC Shakhtyor Soligorsk players
FC Smolevichi players
FC Tolyatti players
Sportspeople from Amur Oblast